Raul Vijil (born September 12, 1982) is a former American football wide receiver for the Spokane Shock of the Arena Football League. He played college football at Eastern Washington, and played for the Shock of af2 and the Arena Football League from 2006 to 2011.

Early life
Vijil attended Pasco High School in Pasco, Washington, where he was a member of the school's soccer team. It wasn't until his senior year of high school that he joined the football team. Vijil helped the Bulldogs to a 14–0 record, en route to a 2000 State Championship. Vijil's 204 receiving yards still stand as a Washington state record for receiving yards in a state title game.

College career
Vijil's senior season of high school football was outstanding enough to earn him a scholarship to Eastern Washington University as a member of the football team.

Professional career
As soon as Vijil graduated, he was recruited by Chris Siegfried to play for the expansion Spokane Shock of the af2. He recorded 421 career receptions for 4,952 yards and 131 touchdowns during his career with the Shock from 2006 to 2011. He rejoined the Shock in 2013 as a public figure and representative for the team before retiring in 2015. His jersey number 15 was retired by the Shock in May 2015.

References

External links 
 Spokane Shock bio
 ArenaFan.com stats

1982 births
Living people
American football wide receivers
Eastern Washington Eagles football players
Spokane Shock players
Players of American football from Washington (state)
People from Pasco, Washington